Andriy Bohdanovych Chikalo (21 January 1964 – 4 February 2008) was a Soviet and Ukrainian professional footballer who played as a defender.

Career

Karpaty Lviv
On 6 March 1992 Benko played in the first ever match of the Vyshcha Liha (now called Ukrainian Premier League) for Karpaty Lviv against Chornomorets Odesa.

Honours
Karpaty Lviv
 Soviet Second League, Zone West: 1991

Lviv
 Ukrainian Second League runner-up: 1994–95

References

External links
 
 

1964 births
2008 deaths
Sportspeople from Lviv
Soviet footballers
Ukrainian footballers
Association football defenders
FC Spartak Ivano-Frankivsk players
FC Karpaty Lviv players
FC Hazovyk Komarno players
FC Lviv (1992) players
Soviet Second League players
Ukrainian Premier League players
Ukrainian First League players
Ukrainian Second League players
Ukrainian football managers